The Haval Cool Dog is a compact SUV produced by Chinese SUV manufacturer Haval, a marque of Great Wall Motors, from 2022.

Overview

The Haval Cool Dog was first revealed as the X Dog concept at Auto Shanghai on April 21, 2021 in Shanghai, China. 

Patents of the production model surfaced in August, and images of it surfaced later in October when the SUV started arriving at Haval dealerships in China. The name was later revealed to be 'Cool Dog'.

A plug-in hybrid model of the Cool Dog will be released after the ICE variant is launched in early 2022.

Specifications

Engine
Two engine options are available for the Cool Dog, a 1.5-litre turbo 4-cylinder producing  and a 2.0-litre turbo 4-cylinder producing  respectively.

Interior
The Haval Cool Dog was noted for its unconventional steering wheel featuring a touchscreen in the center. Another four other touchscreens are also within the interior; a center infotainment system, the digital instrument cluster, a climate control screen on the center console, and small screen on the dashboard for the passenger side.

References

Cars introduced in 2022
Haval vehicles
Cars of China